Heidi M. Hurd is an American lawyer, focusing in criminal law, torts, environmental law, environmental ethics, political theory, moral philosophy and general jurisprudence, currently the David C. Baum Professor of Law and Professor of Philosophy at University of Illinois College of Law and previously the Herzog Research Professor of Law at University of San Diego.

Hurd was Dean at Illinois Law during the University of Illinois clout scandal. According to her admission, "about 15 students" connected to the scandal were admitted to the Law School during her tenure as Dean. She attempted to deny or discount her role in the scandal, but her allegations were dismissed by Judge Abner Mikva, who served as Chair of the Commission that investigated the scandal.

References

American lawyers
American legal scholars
Dalhousie University alumni
Living people
Place of birth missing (living people)
University of Illinois Urbana-Champaign faculty
University of Southern California alumni
Yale University alumni
Year of birth missing (living people)